The following is a list of notable deaths in September 2012.

Entries for each day are listed alphabetically by surname. A typical entry lists information in the following sequence:
Name, age, country of citizenship and reason for notability, established cause of death, reference.

September 2012

1
* Joseph Banchong Aribarg, 85, Thai Roman Catholic prelate, Bishop of Nakhon Sawan (1976–1998).
Sean Bergin, 64, South African jazz musician.
Hal David, 91, American lyricist ("Raindrops Keep Fallin' on My Head"), complications from a stroke.
Boak Jobbins, 65, Australian Anglican cleric, Dean of Sydney (1992–2002), heart attack.
Sat Mahajan, 85, Indian politician, MLA in Himachal Pradesh (1977–1996, 2003–2007) and MP for Kangra (1996–1998), cardiac arrest.
Smarck Michel, 75, Haitian businessman and politician, Prime Minister (1994–1995), brain tumor.
David R. Morrison, 71, Scottish writer and painter.
William Petzäll, 24, Swedish politician, MP for Dalarna County (since 2010), suspected drug overdose.
Dmitri Plavinsky, 75, Russian artist.
Arnaldo Putzu, 85, Italian film poster artist.
Rainbows For Life, 24, Canadian Thoroughbred racehorse, winner of the 1990 Summer Stakes, Cup and Saucer Stakes and Coronation Futurity Stakes, euthanized.
Sy Schulman, 86, American civil engineer and politician, Mayor of White Plains, New York (1993–1997), cancer.
Jon Tolaas, 73, Norwegian poet and novelist.

2
Mark Abrahamian, 46, American musician (Starship), heart attack.
Yugo Araki, 87, Japanese Olympic equestrian.
Adolf Bierbrauer, 97, German artist, painter and sculptor.
Anil Bordia, 78, Indian educationist, social activist and civil servant, cardiac arrest.
Jack Boucher, 80, American photographer (Historic American Buildings Survey), heart disease.
Peter Wilson Coldham, 85, British genealogist.
Bob Johnstone, 82, Canadian broadcaster (CBC Radio), cancer.
John C. Marshall, 71, British musician.
Emmanuel Nunes, 71, Portuguese composer.
Blas Riquelme, 83, Paraguayan politician and businessman.
Len Stephan, 77, Australian politician, member of the Queensland Legislative Assembly (1979–2001).
Bert Worner, 82, Australian football player (Geelong).

3
Ralph Angelo Bernardi, 83, Australian mayor and businessman.
Griselda Blanco, 69, Colombian-born American drug lord, shooting.
Edward Boccia, 91, American painter and poet.
Sir Andrew Crockett, 69, British banker.
Bira Kesari Deo, 85, Indian politician.
Bob DiPietro, 85, American baseball player (Boston Red Sox), cancer.
Harold Dunaway, 78, American stock car driver.
Michael Clarke Duncan, 54, American actor (The Green Mile, Armageddon, Daredevil), heart attack.
Ottó Foky, 85, Hungarian animator.
Hyatt M. Gibbs, 74, American physicist. 
Siegfried Jamrowski, 94, German Luftwaffe pilot and Iron Cross recipient.
Sun Myung Moon, 92, South Korean religious figure, founder of the Unification Church and The Washington Times, pneumonia.
Tito Oreta, 73, Filipino politician, Mayor of Malabon (since 2004), lung cancer.
Charlie Rose, 73, American politician, U.S. Representative from North Carolina (1973–1997), Parkinson's disease. 
Ola Vincent, 87, Nigerian economist and banker, Governor of the Central Bank of Nigeria (1977–1982).

4
* Hamzah Abu Samah, 88, Malaysian politician and sports administrator, MP for Raub (1967–1978) and Temerloh (1978–1980), President of AFC (1978–1994).
Avraham Avigdorov, 83, Israeli soldier, Hero of Israel recipient.
Siân Busby, 51, British writer, lung cancer.
Leila Danette, 103, American actress.
Arleen Day, 63, Canadian curler.
André Delelis, 88, French politician, MP for Pas-de-Calais (1983–1992).
William Engvick, 98, American lyricist.
Hélio Gonçalves Heleno, 77, Brazilian Roman Catholic prelate, Bishop of Caratinga (1979–2011).
Albert Marre, 87, American stage actor, director and producer, widower of soprano Joan Diener, following a long illness.
Ian Parrott, 96, British composer and academic.
George Savitsky, 88, American football player (Philadelphia Eagles), complications from pneumonia.
Sigrid Schjetne, 16, Norwegian homicide victim. (body found on this date)
Syed Mustafa Siraj, 82, Indian writer.
Milan Vukelić, 76, Serbian football player.

5
Ediz Bahtiyaroğlu, 26, Turkish footballer (Eskişehirspor), heart attack.
Dorothy Caley, 92, Canadian figure skater.
Eric Deeral, 79, Australian politician, Queensland MLA for Cook (1974–1977), first Aboriginal member of the Queensland Parliament.
Ian Dick, 86, Australian cricketer and field hockey player.  
Vasily Dyakonov, 66, Russian politician, Governor of Krasnodar Krai (1991–1992).
Martin Filchock, 100, American cartoonist and artist.
Robert Morgan Fink, 96, American biochemist.
Victoria Fyodorova, 66, Russian film actress. 
Christian Marin, 83, French film actor (Le Gendarme de Saint-Tropez, Gendarme in New York).
John Lawrence, 2nd Baron Oaksey, 83, British peer and horse racing journalist.
Tapio Säynevirta, 47, Finnish Olympic sports shooter.
Joe South, 72, American singer-songwriter ("Down in the Boondocks", "Hush", "Rose Garden"), heart failure.
Gord Strate, 77, Canadian ice hockey player (Detroit Red Wings).

6
Ed Barker, 81, American football player (Pittsburgh Penguins, Washington Redskins).
Elisabeth Böhm, 91, German architect.
Susan Clark, 48, American sailor, cancer.
Lawrie Dring, 81, British Scouter, President of the Baden-Powell Scouts' Association.
Jake Eberts, 71, Canadian film producer (City of Joy, Super Mario Bros., Grey Owl), executive and financier, cancer.
Frank Godwin, 95, British film producer (Woman in a Dressing Gown).
Jerome Horwitz, 93, American scientist.
Jerome Kilty, 90, American actor and playwright.
Alan Kimber, 63, English swimmer, cancer.
Maram, 6, American Thoroughbred racehorse, winner of the Breeders' Cup Juvenile Fillies Turf (2008), euthanized.
Art Modell, 87, American businessman, owner of the Baltimore Ravens (1996–2004), heart failure.
Bertil Norström, 88, Swedish actor.
Terry Nutkins, 66, British TV presenter and naturalist, leukaemia.
Oscar Rossi, 82, Argentine football player.
Herbert O. Sparrow, 82, Canadian politician, Senator for Saskatchewan (1968–2005).
Horacio Vázquez-Rial, 65, Argentine-born Spanish writer, cancer.
Roger Wotton, 92, Australian politician, member of the New South Wales Legislative Assembly (1968–1971, 1973–1991).

7
Rudi M. Brewster, 80, American judge.
Richard Bucher, 56, Swiss Olympic ice hockey player, heart attack.
C. Edwin Creed, 91, American football coach.
Gerry Culliton, 76, Irish rugby player.
Leszek Drogosz, 79, Polish Olympic bronze medal-winning (1960) boxer, cancer.
César Fernández Ardavín, 89, Spanish film director (El Lazarillo de Tormes).
Abdul Ghafoor, 70, Pakistani footballer.
Bob Lambert, 55, American entertainment industry executive (The Walt Disney Company).
Louise LaPlanche, 93, American actress.
Aleksandr Maksimenkov, 60, Russian football coach and player.
Dorothy McGuire, 84, American singer, complications of Parkinson's disease.
Alphonse Nzoungou, 74, Congolese politician.
Maestro Reverendo, 57, Spanish musician and composer, cancer.
Nicole Russell, Duchess of Bedford, 92, French-born British television producer and socialite.
Rollin Sullivan, 93, American country music entertainer (Lonzo and Oscar).
Daniel Weinreb, 53, American computer scientist and programmer, cancer.

8
Adnan Farhan Abd Al Latif, 30–31, Yemeni detainee (Guantánamo Bay).
María Elvia Amaya Araujo, 58, Mexican psychologist, philanthropist, and politician, multiple myeloma.
Xavier-Marie Baronnet, 85, French-born Seychellois Roman Catholic prelate, Bishop of Port Victoria o Seychelles (1995–2002).
Adolf Bechtold, 86, German footballer (Eintracht Frankfurt).
Aleksandr Belyavsky, 80, Russian actor.
Brian Crossley, 85, English-born Australian actor (Adventure Island) and director.
Luís d'Andrea, 78, Brazilian Roman Catholic bishop.
Bob Hale, 78, American baseball player (Baltimore Orioles, Cleveland Indians, New York Yankees).
Leigh Hamilton, 62, New Zealand-born American actress (Forced Vengeance, Gas Food Lodging, Hocus Pocus).
Ronald Hamowy, 75, American historian.
Peter Hussing, 64, German Olympic bronze medallist boxer (1972).
André Kempinaire, 83, Belgian politician.
Mike Martineau, 53, American television writer (Rescue Me, Mad About You), heart disease.
Bill Moggridge, 69, British industrial designer, cancer.
Mārtiņš Roze, 47, Latvian politician, Minister of Agriculture (2002–2009), blood clot.
Allyre Sirois, 89, Canadian jurist.
Thomas Szasz, 92, Hungarian-born American psychiatrist.
Elizabeth Wood-Ellem, 81, Tongan historian.
Ocak Işık Yurtçu, 67, Turkish journalist.
Mario Armond Zamparelli, 91, American design artist and painter, husband of Maureen Hingert.

9
Hugh Bentall, 92, British pioneer surgeon.
Donna Bruton, 58, American painter.
Günter Discher, 87, German musician.
Larry Gibson, 66, American environmentalist, heart attack.
Rudolf Kleiner, 88, Swiss Olympic speed skater.
Verghese Kurien, 90, Indian engineer and businessman, kidney failure.
Désiré Letort, 69, French cyclist.
John McCarthy, 22, Australian AFL footballer (Port Adelaide), fall from a building.
Monsun, 22, German Thoroughbred racehorse, winner of the Aral-Pokal (1993) and Preis von Europa (1993, 1994), euthanized.
*José Rodrigues de Souza, 86, Brazilian Roman Catholic prelate, Bishop of Juazeiro (1975–2003).
Mike Scarry, 92, American football player and coach.
Ron Taylor, 78, Australian marine conservationist, myeloid leukemia.
Ron Tindall, 76, English footballer (Chelsea).

10
Muslehuddin Ahmad, 80, Bangladeshi diplomat and university administrator, consequences of stroke.
Raquel Correa, 78, Chilean journalist, cerebral damage followed by heart failure.
Vondell Darr, 93, American actress.
György Enyedi, 82, Hungarian geographer.
Robert Gammage, 74, American jurist and politician, member of the House of Representatives (1977–1979), heart attack.
Lance LeGault, 77, American actor (The A-Team, Magnum, P.I., Home on the Range), heart failure.
Stanley Long, 78, British cinematographer and film director, natural causes.
Tadahiro Matsushita, 73, Japanese politician, member of the House of Representatives (1993–2005, since 2007).
Robert B. McKeon, 58, American businessman and philanthropist, suicide.
John Moffatt, 89, English actor and playwright.
*Ernesto de la Peña, 84, Mexican writer.
Tom Saffell, 91, American baseball player (Pittsburgh Pirates) and executive, President of Gulf Coast League (1979–2009), pneumonia.
Steven Springer, 60, American guitarist and songwriter, lung cancer.
Hans Joachim Störig, 97, German non-fiction author, translator and publisher.
James Wellbeloved, 86, British politician, MP for Erith and Crayford (1965–1983).
Edwin P. Wilson, 84, American CIA and U.S. Naval Intelligence officer, complications of surgery.

11
Rolf Bjørn Backe, 78, Norwegian footballer.
Bruce Bolling, 67, American politician, prostate cancer.
Finn Bergesen, 67, Norwegian business executive and lawyer, cancer.
Tibor Csernai, 73, Hungarian Olympic champion footballer (1964).
Erwin Dold, 92, German pilot.
Rein Etruk, 74, Estonian chess player.
Tomas Evjen, 39, Norwegian film producer (Dead Snow).
Tony Goldman, 68, American real estate developer, art impresario and preservationist (SoHo, Miami Beach Architectural District). 
Maurice Keen, 78, British historian.
Sergio Livingstone, 92, Chilean footballer and sports commentator, natural causes.
Charles Pidjot, 50, New Caledonian politician, President of the Caledonian Union.
Irving S. Reed, 88, American mathematician and engineer.
Manuel Salvat Dalmau, 86, Spanish publisher.
Sean Smith, 34, American diplomat serving in Libya, injuries sustained during U.S. Consulate attack in Benghazi.
Bruce Von Hoff, 68, American baseball player (Houston Astros).

12
Jimmy Andrews, 85, Scottish footballer.
Siarhei Artsiukhin, 35, Russian wrestler, European Greco-Roman wrestling champion, heart attack.
Radoslav Brzobohatý, 79, Czech actor, stroke.
Charles Kennedy Comans, 97, Australian lawyer, First Parliamentary Counsel of the Commonwealth (1972–1977).
Shaun Cummins, 44, British boxer, murdered (body found on that day).
Glen Doherty, 42, American company employee, mortar attack.
Arkadii Dragomoshchenko, 66, Russian poet.
Jon Finlayson, 74, Australian actor (Zoo Family), cancer.
Alfred Henningsen, 94, Norwegian military officer and politician.
Geoffrey Horrocks, 79, British mathematician.
Derek Jameson, 82, British journalist and broadcaster, heart attack.
Michael Lee, 76, Zimbabwean cricketer.
Keith Lewis, 89, Australian cricketer.
Janet Liang, 25, American health advocate, lymphoblastic leukemia.
Rafał Piszcz, 71, Polish Olympic bronze medal-winning (1972) sprint canoer.
Audrie Pott, 15, American cyberbullying victim, suicide by hanging.
William Schatzkamer, 96, American pianist and conductor.
Tom Sims, 62, American skate and snowboarder, founder of Sims Snowboards, cardiac arrest.
J. Christopher Stevens, 52, American diplomat, U.S. Ambassador to Libya (2012), smoke inhalation during U.S. Consulate attack in Benghazi.
Sid Watkins, 84, British neurosurgeon, Formula One safety and medical delegate.
Whobegotyou, 7, Australian Thoroughbred racehorse.

13
Jean-Claude Abric, 70, French psychologist.
Obo Addy, 76, Ghanaian drummer, National Heritage Fellowship recipient (1996), liver cancer.
Michel Baud, 48, French Egyptologist, suicide.
Aditya Dev, 23, Indian bodybuilder, ruptured brain aneurysm.
John E. Dohms, 65, American microbiologist. (disappeared on this date)
William Duckworth, 69, American composer, pancreatic cancer.
Griffith Edwards, 83, Indian-born British psychiatrist and addiction specialist.
Dilhan Eryurt, 85, Turkish astrophysicist, heart attack.
Robyn Few, 53, American sex worker rights activist (Sex Workers Outreach Project USA), cancer. 
Tomlinson Fort Jr., 80, American chemist.
Pedro E. Guerrero, 95, American photographer, cancer.
Leopold Koss, 92, American pathologist.
Lehri, 83, Pakistani actor and comedian, complications from diabetes.
Peter Lougheed, 84, Canadian politician, Premier of Alberta (1971–1985); MLA for Calgary-West (1967–1986), natural causes.
Brian Óg Maguire, 24, Irish Gaelic football player, industrial accident.
Mary Rose McGeady, 84, American Roman Catholic nun.
Edgar Metcalfe, 78, English actor, director and writer, liver cancer.
Ranganath Misra, 85, Indian jurist, Chief Justice (1990–1991), neurological disorder.
Jack Pierce, 64, American baseball player (Atlanta Braves, Detroit Tigers), heart attack.
Otto Stich, 85, Swiss politician, President of the Confederation (1988, 1994).
John Turner, 63, English cricketer.

14
Jacques Antoine, 88, French game show writer, creator of Fort Boyard and The Crystal Maze, cardiac arrest.
Pinkie Barnes, 97, English table tennis player.
Don Binney, 72, New Zealand painter, cardiac arrest.
Jaylee Burley Mead, 83, American astronomer.
* Eduardo Castro Luque, 48, Mexican politician, shooting.
Dame Joy Drayton, 96, New Zealand academic, educator and politician.
Frank Dudley, 87, English footballer.
Stephen Dunham, 48, American actor (The Mummy, What I Like About You, Monster-in-Law), heart attack.
Gérard Ghidini, 69,  French slalom canoeist.
*Sir Yuet-Keung Kan, 99, Hong Kong banker, politician, and lawyer, senior unofficial member of the Executive Council (1974–1980).
Michel Leduc, 71, Canadian politician, last mayor of LaSalle, Quebec, Canada (1983–2001) before amalgamation, cancer.
Winston Rekert, 63, Canadian actor (Neon Rider, Battlestar Galactica), cancer.
Louis Simpson, 89, American poet, Alzheimer's disease.
András Szente, 72, Hungarian sprint canoer, Olympic dual silver medalist (1960).

15
Tibor Antalpéter, 82, Hungarian volleyball player and diplomat, Ambassador to the United Kingdom (1990–1995).
Fred Bodsworth, 93, Canadian writer.
Predrag Brzaković, 47, Serbian footballer, heart attack.
Carlos Calderón de la Barca, 77, Mexican football player.
Pilar Coll, 83, Spanish activist, missionary and lawyer.
James "Sugar Boy" Crawford, 77, American rhythm and blues singer.
Olga Ferri, 83, Argentine ballet dancer.
Jean-Louis Heinrich, 69, French footballer.
George Hurst, 86, British conductor.
Arthur Magugu, 78, Kenyan politician, Minister for Finance (1982–1988), MP for Githunguri (1969–1988, 2002–2007).
Pierre Mondy, 87, French actor (Now Where Did the 7th Company Get to?) and director (La Cage aux Folles), lymphoma.
Paul Okesene, 44, Samoan rugby league player, heart attack.
Stephen Paul, 58, American physicist.
Max Soriano, 86, American baseball team co-owner (Seattle Pilots).
Nevin Spence, 22, Irish rugby union player (Ulster), slurry tank gas poisoning.
K. S. Sudarshan, 81, Indian nationalist, Sarsanghchalak of the RSS (2000–2009), heart attack.

16
John Coates, 84, British animated film producer (The Snowman), cancer.
Charles E. Collins, 83, American politician and activist. 
Dana Deshler, 75, American politician.
John Ingle, 84, American actor (Death Becomes Her, General Hospital, Batman & Robin), cancer.
Roman Kroitor, 85, Canadian filmmaker.
Julien J. LeBourgeois, 88, American vice admiral, heart and kidney ailments.
Loose Mohan, 84, Indian actor, respiratory issues.
Shinichi Nishimiya, 60, Japanese diplomat, Ambassador-designate to China (2012), acute heart failure.
Princess Ragnhild, Mrs. Lorentzen, 82, Norwegian royal, eldest child of King Olav V.
* Jaime Serrano Cedillo, 45, Mexican politician, stabbing.
Muhammadjon Shakuri, 87, Tajik academic, cancer.
Suthivelu, 65, Indian film actor and comedian, cardiac arrest.
Friedrich Zimmermann, 87, German politician, Minister of the Interior (1982–1989); Minister of Transport (1989–1991).

17
Bafo Biyela, 31, South African footballer, after short illness.
William S. Calli, 88, American lawyer and politician.
Melvin Charney, 77, Canadian artist and architect.
Alan Cleveley, 88, English cricketer.
Prem Ram Dubey, 78, Indian activist, after prolonged illness.
Esther Gamlielit, 93, Israeli singer.
Pauline Hill, 86, American AAGPBL baseball player.
Lou Kenton, 104, English potter and Spanish Civil War veteran.
Édouard Leclerc, 85, French businessman, founder of E.Leclerc supermarket chain.
Nikodimos of Ierissos, 81, Greek Orthodox prelate, Bishop of Ierissos (since 1981).
Tridev Roy, 79, Bangladeshi-born Pakistani politician, Buddhist leader and Chakma raja (1953–1971), Ambassador to Argentina (1981–1996).
Tedi Thurman, 89, American fashion model and actress.
Russell E. Train, 92, American civil servant, Administrator of the EPA (1973–1977) and President of the WWF (1978–1985).
Ferenc Polikárp Zakar, 82, Hungarian Cistercian monk, Archabbot of the Zirc Abbey (1996–2010).

18
Santiago Carrillo, 97, Spanish politician, veteran of the Spanish Civil War.
Wantha Davis, 95, American female jockey and pioneer in thoroughbred horse racing.
Peter Demos, 94, Canadian physicist.
Deputed Testamony, 32, American Thoroughbred racehorse.
Leo Goeke, 74, American opera singer, complications of strokes.
Luís Goes, 79, Portuguese singer.
Haim Hefer, 86, Israeli songwriter, poet, and writer.
Michael Hurll, 75, British television producer, Parkinson's disease.
Jim Jordan, 84, Canadian politician, MP for Leeds—Grenville (1988–1997), cancer.
Betty Kaunda, 84, Zambian First Lady (1964–1991), wife of Kenneth Kaunda.
Jack Kralick, 77, American baseball player (Washington Senators/Minnesota Twins), complications from strokes.
Michel Joseph Kuehn, 89, French Roman Catholic prelate, Bishop of Chartres (1978–1991).
Jorge Manicera, 73, Uruguayan footballer.
Ralph Marshall, 85, Bermudian politician, MP for Southampton West (1963–1993), pneumonia.
Steve Sabol, 69, American filmmaker, co-founder of NFL Films, brain cancer.
Olinto Sampaio Rubini, 78, Mexican footballer.
Brian Woolnough, 63, British sports journalist, cancer.
Wu Shaozu, 73, Chinese major general and politician, Chairperson of the Chinese Olympic Committee (1995–1999).

19
Paul Adderley, 84, Bahamian politician and lawyer.
Behnam Abu Alsoof, 80, Iraqi archaeologist, anthropologist, historian and writer, heart attack.
Víctor Cabedo, 23, Spanish racing cyclist, road accident. 
Chief Bearhart, 19, Canadian Thoroughbred racehorse, winner of the 1997 Canadian International Stakes and Breeders' Cup Turf, heart failure.
Patrick Creagh, 81, British poet and translator.
Rino Ferrario, 85, Italian footballer.
Leopoldo Penna Franca, 53, Brazilian mathematician, heart attack.
Cecil Gordon, 71, American NASCAR driver and team owner, cancer.
Bettye Lane, 82, American photojournalist, cancer.
Leonard Lerman, 87, American geneticist, complications of a chronic neurological disease.
Elizabeth Percy, Duchess of Northumberland, 90, British peeress, widow of the 10th Duke of Northumberland.
Charlie Richardson, 78, English mobster, peritonitis.
Itamar Singer, 66, Romanian-born Israeli Hittitologist.

20
Fortunato Baldelli, 77, Italian Roman Catholic cardinal, Major Penitentiary of the Apostolic Penitentiary (2009–2012).
Robert G. Barrett, 69, Australian author (Les Norton series), cancer.
Richard H. Cracroft, 76, American academic.
Gianfranco Dell'Innocenti, 86, Italian footballer.
Anatoli Fedorov, 76, Soviet and Russian rower and rowing coach.
Alan Neville Gent, 84, English scientist.
Robert Wayne Harris, 40, American mass murderer, execution by lethal injection.
Ulla Lock, 78, Danish film actress.
Paul O'Connor, 49, Irish hurler (Cork).
Michel Pech, 66, French football player (FC Nantes), cancer.
Paul Pojman, 45, American philosopher, cancer.
Herbert Rosendorfer, 78, German writer.
Robert Sharer, 72, American Mayanist. 
Bhupendra Silwal, 76, Nepalese Olympic runner.
Dinesh Thakur, 65, Indian theatre director and actor (Rajnigandha), kidney ailments.
Tereska Torrès, 92, French writer.
Dorothy Wedderburn, 87, British academic.

21
Pedro de Almeida, 73, Portuguese Olympic athlete.
Mike Baker, 55, British journalist (BBC, The Guardian), lung cancer.
Konda Laxman Bapuji, 96, Indian politician and freedom fighter.
Henry Bauchau, 99, Belgian psychoanalyst and author.
Max C. Brewer, 88, Canadian scientist.
Ed Conlin, 79, American basketball player (Syracuse Nationals, Philadelphia Warriors, Detroit Pistons).
José Curbelo, 95, Cuban-born American jazz musician and manager, heart failure.
Mary DeMelim, 82, American academic administrator.
Yehuda Elkana, 78, Israeli historian and philosopher, President and Rector of the Central European University (1999–2009), cancer.
Sven Hassel, 95, Danish-born German soldier and author.
Karl-Gustav Kaisla, 68, Finnish ice hockey referee (Miracle on Ice).
Gopalan Kasturi, 87, Indian newspaper editor (The Hindu).
Bill King, 102, British naval officer, yachtsman, and author.
Michael Rye, 94, American voice actor (Disney's Adventures of the Gummi Bears, Super Friends).
Bruno Schettino, 71, Italian Roman Catholic prelate, Archbishop of Capua (since 1997).
Mike Sparken, 82, French racing driver, cancer.
Tom Umphlett, 81, American baseball player (Boston Red Sox, Washington Senators)
Len Weare, 78, Welsh footballer (Newport County).
Sir John Woodcock, 80, British police officer, Chief Inspector of Constabulary (1990–1993).

22
Hector Abhayavardhana, 93, Sri Lankan political theorist.
Irving Adler, 99, American author, mathematician, and scientist.
Anna-Lisa Augustsson, 87, Swedish sprinter.
Rolf Bercht, 87, Brazilian Olympic sailor.
Brandon Brown, 26, American football player, injuries sustained during beating.
Juan H. Cintrón García, 93, Puerto Rican politician.
Nicholas T. Clerk, 82, Ghanaian academic, natural causes.
Robert Davidson, 85, Scottish theologian. 
Grigory Frid, 97, Russian composer, artist and writer.
Gideon Gadot, 71, Israeli journalist and politician, member of the Knesset (1984–1992).
Lewis McGibbon, 80, English cricketer (Northamptonshire).
Mustaf Haji Mohamed, Somali politician and MP, shooting.
Harry Pilling, 69, British cricketer (Lancashire).
Jan Hendrik van den Berg, 98, Dutch psychiatrist.

23
Caroline Iverson Ackerman, 94, American aviator, journalist, reporter and educator.
Ashwini, 45, Indian actress, liver illness.
Bodo Bittner, 72, German Olympic bronze medallist bobsledder (1976). 
Henry Champ, 75, Canadian journalist (Canadian Broadcasting Corporation), lung cancer.
Molly Clark, 89, Australian pastoral and tourism pioneer.
Bennie L. Davis, 94, American general (Strategic Air Command, 1981–1985). 
Ralf Drecoll, 67, German Olympic high jumper.
Andrew Duffy, 24, Irish football player and fan, drowning.
Maria Pia Gardini, 75, Italian entrepreneur.
Martí Gasull i Roig, 43, Spanish Catalan linguistic activist and a mountaineer, avalanche.
Alberto González, 84, Cuban humorist and iconoclast.
Pavel Grachev, 64, Russian general, Minister of Defence (1992–1996), acute meningoencephalitis.
* K Lal, 88, Indian magician, brain cancer.
Winrich Kolbe, 71, German-born American television director (Star Trek, Knight Rider, Angel). (death announced on this date)
Sir Godfrey Milton-Thompson, 82, British naval surgeon.
John O'Neill, 77, Irish footballer (Preston North End F.C.).
Albert Henry Ottenweller, 96, American Roman Catholic prelate, Bishop of Steubenville (1977–1992).
Mulraj Rajda, 80, Indian writer, actor and director.
Roberto Rodríguez, 70, Venezuelan baseball player (Kansas City/Oakland Athletics, San Diego Padres, Chicago Cubs), heart attack.
Michael Rowland, 83, British-born South African Roman Catholic prelate, Bishop of Dundee, South Africa (1983–2005).
Corrie Sanders, 46, South African boxer, shooting.
Sam Sniderman, 92, Canadian entrepreneur, founder of Sam the Record Man.
Maths O. Sundqvist, 61, Swedish entrepreneur and business magnate, vehicle collision.
Jean Taittinger, 89, French politician, Minister of Justice (1973–1974).
Jason Winrow, 41, American football player (New York Giants).
Radya Yeroshina, 82, Russian cross-country skier.

24
Pierre Adam, 88, French Olympic gold medallist cyclist (1948).
Abu Akash, Iraqi Al-Qaeda operative, drone strike.
Edward A. Biery, 92, American film editor.
Bruno Bobak, 88, Polish-born Canadian war artist, cancer.
Annemarie Davidson, 91–92, German-born American artist.
Sal Frederick, 86, American businessman and politician.
Thilakan, 74, Indian Malayalam actor, heart attack.
Pedro Vázquez Colmenares, 78, Mexican politician, Governor of Oaxaca (1980–1985).

25
Gordon Ada, 89, Australian biochemist.  
Billy Barnes, 85, American composer and lyricist (The Billy Barnes Revue), complications from Alzheimer's disease.
Mohamed Bah, American police victim, shot.
Wilfried Bode, 82, German Olympic water polo player.
John Bond, 79, English football player and manager.
Audrey Deemer, 81, American baseball player.
Neşet Ertaş, 74, Turkish folk musician, cancer.
Maurice Stanley Friedman, 90, American philosopher.
Lorenzo Gamboa, 93, Filipino emigrant.
André Giamarchi, 81, French footballer.
Trevor Hardy, 67, British serial killer, heart attack.
Eric Ives, 81, British historian.
Dame Louise Johnson, 71, British biochemist and protein crystallographer.
Patrick Kalilombe, 79, Malawian Roman Catholic prelate, Bishop of Lilongwe (1972–1979).
Nigel Leathern, 80, South African cricketer.
Alonso Lujambio, 50, Mexican politician, Secretary of Public Education (2009–2012), multiple myeloma.
Alfredo Machado, 59, Brazilian Olympic swimmer.
Jakub Polák, 60, Czech anarchist and Romani rights activist, cancer.
Andy Williams, 84, American singer ("Moon River") and entertainer, bladder cancer.

26
Edith Allard, 85, American ballerina.
Pape Alioune Diop, Senegalese football player and manager (national team, 1982–1986), Alzheimer's disease.
M'el Dowd, 79, American actress and singer (Camelot).
Sylvia Fedoruk, 85, Canadian scientist, athlete, and politician, Lieutenant Governor of Saskatchewan (1988–1994), complications from a fall.
Laura Fry, 45, British Olympic equestrian.
Eugene Genovese, 82, American academic and author, cardiac ailment.
Donald Gregg, 88, Australian cricketer.
Vance Heafner, 58, American golfer and director (Prestonwood Country Club), suspected heart attack.
Johnny Lewis, 28, American actor (Sons of Anarchy, The O.C., Drake & Josh), injuries from a fall.
Maya Nasser, 33, Syrian journalist (Press TV), shooting.
Tatsuo Nishida, 83, Japanese academic, heart attack.
Florisvaldo de Oliveira, 53, Brazilian vigilante, serial killer and police officer, shot.
Shah Saeed Ahmed Raipuri, 86, Indian religious leader.
Arturo Rodenak, 81, Argentine-born Chilean footballer, complications of diabetes.
Sam Steiger, 83, American politician, U.S. Representative (1967–1977) and Arizona Senator (1960–1967), complications from a stroke.
James Sullivan, 86, American public administrator, city manager of Cambridge, Massachusetts (1968–1970, 1974–1981), and Lowell, Massachusetts  (1970–1974).

27
L. Adaikalaraj, 76, Indian politician.
Eddie Bert, 90, American jazz trombonist.
Sachiko Eto, 65, Japanese cult leader and serial killer, executed.
Aleksandr Gorelik, 67, Russian pair skater and figure skating commentator.
R. B. Greaves, 68, American singer ("Take a Letter Maria"), prostate cancer.
Herbert Lom, 95, Czech-born British actor (The Pink Panther, Spartacus, Gambit, The Ladykillers).
Ted Boy Marino, 72, Italian-born Brazilian actor and telecatch wrestler, cardiac arrest.
Joseph Parker, Jr., 95, American Navy physician, last surviving physician from Omaha Beach.
John Silber, 86, American academic, President of Boston University, kidney failure.
Sanjay Surkar, 53, Indian Marathi film director, heart attack.
Rob Tetzlaff, 76, American Olympic cyclist.
Frank Wilson, 71, American songwriter and record producer, prostate cancer.

28
Avraham Adan, 85, Israeli major general, cardiac arrest.
Crispin Aubrey, 66, British journalist.
Lateef Adegbite, 79, Nigerian politician and Muslim leader.
Juan Baena, 62, Spanish footballer (Hércules CF), complications from brain surgery.
Richard Bocking, 81, Canadian filmmaker.
James E. Burke, 87, American businessman, CEO of Johnson & Johnson (1976–1989).
Larry Cunningham, 74, Irish showband singer.
Chris Economaki, 91, American motorsports journalist.
Sam Gruneisen, 71, American football player (San Diego Chargers).
Joe Habie, 55, Guatemalan businessman (Tikal Futura), helicopter crash.
Kevin Harrold, 83, Australian politician, member of the New South Wales Legislative Assembly (1973–1976). 
Jack Koehler, 82, German-born American media executive, White House communications director (1987), pancreatic cancer.
Robert Manning, 92, American journalist, lymphoma. 
Abdul Ghani Minhat, 76, Malaysian footballer, complications following surgery.
Brajesh Mishra, 83, Indian diplomat, National Security Advisor (1998–2004), coronary artery disease.
Michael O'Hare, 60, American actor (Babylon 5), heart attack.
Ahmed Ramzy, 82, Egyptian actor (Sira` Fi al-Mina, Thartharah Fawq al-Nil), injuries from a fall.
M. S. Shinde, 83, Indian film editor (Sholay).
Pierluigi Vigna, 79, Italian magistrate, cancer.
Stanisław Waśkiewicz, 65, Polish runner.

29
Hathloul bin Abdulaziz Al Saud, 70, Saudi Arabian prince, member of the House of Saud.
Abdul Haq Baloch, 34, Pakistani journalist, shot.
Carlos Büsser, 84, Argentine rear admiral, led the 1982 invasion of the Falkland Islands, heart attack.
Hebe Camargo, 83, Brazilian television presenter, cardiac arrest.
Robin Fior, 77, English graphic designer.
Foulath Hadid, 75, Iraqi writer and academic.
Michael Henry Heim, 69, American translator and academic, cancer.
Abdul Rahim Malhas, 75, Jordanian politician, Health Minister (1993–1994), member of the House of Representatives (2003–2007).
Henry F. May, 97, American historian.
Nancy Millis, 90, Australian microbiologist.
Yvonne Mounsey, 93, U.S.-based South African ballet dancer (New York City Ballet), cancer.
Antônio Maria Mucciolo, 89, Italian-born Brazilian Roman Catholic prelate, Archbishop of Botucatu (1989–2000), multiple organ failure.
*Nan Huai-Chin, 95, Chinese Buddhist scholar, pneumonia.
John M. Rodgers, 84, American politician, member of the Pennsylvania House of Representatives.
Nao Saejima, 44, Japanese model and actress, cancer.
László Sebők, 74, Hungarian Olympic boxer.
Knut Sydsæter, 74, Norwegian mathematician, drowning.
Neil Smith, 58, Scottish geographer, multiple organ failure.
Bob Stevens, American college basketball coach (Oklahoma, South Carolina), boating accident.
Punch Sulzberger, 86, American publisher (The New York Times).
Mark Wiener, 61, American painter.
Malcolm Wicks, 65, British politician, MP for Croydon North West (1992–1997) and Croydon North (since 1997), cancer.
Rakitha Wimaladarma, 27, Sri Lankan cricketer.

30
Turhan Bey, 90, Austrian-born American actor, Parkinson's disease.
James Burchett, 81, Australian judge.
Barry Commoner, 95, American biologist and politician, founder of the Citizen's Party, 1980 presidential nominee.
María Eugenia Cordovez, 77, Ecuadorian First Lady (1984–1988), former wife of León Febres Cordero, cardiac arrest.
Autran Dourado, 86, Brazilian writer, stomach bleeding.
Gaariye, 63, Somalian poet.
Dorothy Gillespie, 92, American artist and sculptor.
Bobby Jaggers, 64, American professional wrestler, renal failure.
Clara Stanton Jones, 99, American librarian, President of the American Library Association (1976–1977).
Mary Freeman-Grenville, 12th Lady Kinloss, 90, Scottish peer.
Mark R. Kravitz, 62, American federal judge, amyotrophic lateral sclerosis.
P. J. Morley, 81, Irish politician, TD for Mayo East (1977–1997).
Jack Morris, 84, American Jesuit, founder of the Jesuit Volunteer Corps, cancer. 
Raylene Rankin, 52, Canadian singer (The Rankin Family), breast cancer.
Barbara Ann Scott, 84, Canadian figure skater, Olympic gold medalist (1948).
Boris Šprem, 56, Croatian politician, President of Parliament (since 2011), plasmacytoma.
Bob Wade, 92, American crime writer.
Wang Zhongcheng, 86, Chinese academic.
Jonathan Wentz, 21, American paralympic equestrian.
Joseph B. Willigers, 81, Dutch-born Ugandan Roman Catholic prelate, Bishop of Jinja (1967–2010).

References

2012-09
 09

simple:Deaths in 2012#September